Fernando José Ribeiro Alexandre (born 2 August 1985) is a Portuguese former professional footballer who played mainly as a defensive midfielder.

Club career
Born in Lourinhã, Lisbon District, Alexandre started his professional career with S.L. Benfica, but could never make any official appearances for the first team. From 2004 to 2006 he played with the club's reserves (soon to be extinct) and in the second division, with Lisbon neighbours C.D. Olivais e Moscavide.

After one season in the third tier with C.D. Mafra – also in the region – Alexandre moved to C.F. Estrela da Amadora, again in the capital but now in the Primeira Liga. He was an essential figure in midfield, as the side finished in a comfortable mid-table position in spite of serious financial difficulties.

In late June 2009, after Estrela were relegated off-court, Alexandre moved to S.C. Braga on a free transfer and a four-year contract. He still participated in one league match with the Minho team, playing 25 minutes in a 2–1 win at Sporting CP but, just hours before the August transfer window closed, was sent on loan to Leixões S.C. also of the top flight, remaining on loan the following two years but with S.C. Olhanense.

On 4 July 2013, Académica de Coimbra completed the signing of Alexandre, with the free agent penning a one-year contract and reuniting with former Olhanense manager Sérgio Conceição. He was regularly used in the next top-division campaigns, scoring three goals from 27 games in 2015–16 but being relegated.

During the 2017 January transfer window, Alexandre was loaned to Moreirense FC.

Honours
Moreirense
Taça da Liga: 2016–17

References

External links

1985 births
Living people
Portuguese footballers
Association football midfielders
Primeira Liga players
Liga Portugal 2 players
Segunda Divisão players
S.L. Benfica B players
S.L. Benfica footballers
C.D. Olivais e Moscavide players
C.D. Mafra players
C.F. Estrela da Amadora players
S.C. Braga players
Leixões S.C. players
S.C. Olhanense players
Associação Académica de Coimbra – O.A.F. players
Moreirense F.C. players
Portugal youth international footballers
Sportspeople from Lisbon District